A number of steamships have been named Imkenturm, including:-

, a cargo ship in service 1909-19
, a Hansa A Type cargo ship in service in 1945
, a cargo ship in service 1956-61

Ship names